Robert Edward Adlard (15 November 1915 – 22 October 2008) was an English field hockey player who competed in the 1948 Summer Olympics representing Great Britain.

He was a member of the British field hockey team, which won the silver medal.

External links
 
Robert Adlard's profile at Sports Reference.com

1915 births
2008 deaths
British male field hockey players
Olympic field hockey players of Great Britain
Field hockey players at the 1948 Summer Olympics
English Olympic medallists
Olympic silver medallists for Great Britain
Olympic medalists in field hockey
Medalists at the 1948 Summer Olympics